John Goss may refer to:

 John Goss (baritone) (1894–1953), English baritone
Sir John Goss (composer) (1800–1880), English organist and composer
John Goss (racing driver) (born 1943), Australian racing driver
John Goss Special, a version of the Ford Falcon built to celebrate his Bathurst win in 1974
John Goss (politician) (born 1943), Australian politician
John C. Goss (born 1958), American artist and author
John Goss (badminton), played Badminton at the 1986 Commonwealth Games

See also
John Gosse, Canadian geologist